Trnova (Cyrillic: Трнова) is a populated location near the town of Ugljevik, in the Republika Srpska zone of Bosnia-Herzegovina. It is divided between Gornja Trnova, where in 1991 nearly all residents were Serbs, and Srednja Trnova, where in the same year most were Bosniaks.

Gornja Trnova 
The total population of Gornja Trnova is 420, comprising 413 Serbs (98.33%), 2 Croats (0.47%), 2 Yugoslavs (0.47%) and 3 others and unknown (0.71%.)

Srednja Trnova 
Out of Srednja Trnova's population, 682 (94.59%) were Bosniaks, 24 (3.32%) were Yugoslavs, 12 (1.66%) were Serbs and 3 (0.41%) were others and unknown.

History

Notable people
 Filip Višnjić

References

 Official results from the book: Ethnic composition of Bosnia-Herzegovina population, by municipalities and settlements, 1991. census, Zavod za statistiku Bosne i Hercegovine - Bilten no.234, Sarajevo 1991.

Ugljevik
Villages in Republika Srpska